Sione Havili Talitui (born 25 January 1998) is a Tongan born New Zealand rugby union player who plays for  in the Bunnings NPC and the  in the Super Rugby competition. His position of choice is flanker.

Early career 
In 2016 Havili represented the NZ Secondary Schools team, awarded the Golden Boot for the country's best player.

Senior career 
Havili made his Mitre 10 Cup debut in 2017 for  playing 2 games and scoring a try in the season. He made his debut for the  during the 2018 Super Rugby season. He was loaned to Tasman for the 2018 Mitre 10 Cup however his season was cut short by injury, but Tasman coach Andrew Goodman ensured he returned and Havili signed through with the Mako until the end of 2021. He was part of the Tasman Mako team that won the Mitre 10 Cup in 2019 for the first time. Following an outstanding season with Tasman Havili was named in the  squad for the 2020 Super Rugby season. Havili was again part of the Mako side that won the 2020 Mitre 10 Cup, receiving Mako player of the year, Mako man of the year and defender of the year at the Mako awards. In Round 3 of the 2021 Bunnings NPC Havili suffered a season ending injury while playing for Tasman against . In May 2022 he was named in the Tongan national side.

References

External links
 

New Zealand rugby union players
1998 births
Living people
Rugby union flankers
Auckland rugby union players
Blues (Super Rugby) players
Tasman rugby union players
Crusaders (rugby union) players
Rugby union number eights
Tonga international rugby union players
Tongan rugby union players